Soanda, or Soandum or Soandon (Σόανδον), was a fortified settlement of ancient Cappadocia, inhabited in Roman times. The same place seems to be alluded to by Frontinus, who calls it Suenda.

Its site is tentatively located near Uşaklı Höyük (Kuşaklı Hüyük), Asiatic Turkey.

References

Populated places in ancient Cappadocia
Former populated places in Turkey
Roman towns and cities in Turkey
Populated places of the Byzantine Empire
History of Kırşehir Province